Oleg Ivanovich Samsonov (born 7 September 1987) is a Russian former footballer.

Career
He made his Russian Premier League debut for PFC Spartak Nalchik on 5 May 2007 in a game against FC Dynamo Moscow.

The promising youngster spent the 2007 and 2008 seasons on loan at FC Spartak Nalchik and moved on 20 December 2008 from FC Zenit Saint Petersburg to FC Khimki on loan .

External links
 
 
 

1987 births
Living people
People from Voronezh Oblast
Russian footballers
Russia youth international footballers
Russia under-21 international footballers
Russia national football B team footballers
Association football midfielders
Russian Premier League players
PFC Spartak Nalchik players
FC Khimki players
PFC Krylia Sovetov Samara players
FC Krasnodar players
FC Tyumen players
FC Fakel Voronezh players
FC Zenit Saint Petersburg players
FC Krasnodar-2 players
FC Sportakademklub Moscow players
Sportspeople from Voronezh Oblast